Ora Charjon is a 1988 Bengali film directed by Samit Bhanja and produced by Ranja Film Enterprise. The film features actors Prosenjit Chatterjee and Debashree Roy in the lead roles. Music of the film has been composed by Arun Rabin.

Cast 
 Prosenjit Chatterjee as Joseph
 Debika Mitra as Reena
 Debashree Roy
 Abhishek Chatterjee as Sundar
 Rabi Ghosh
 Anup Kumar
 Chinmoy Roy
 Shakuntala Barua

References

External links
 

1988 films
Bengali-language Indian films
1980s Bengali-language films